Adams Mountain (variant name: Adams Knob) is a mountain near the unincorporated community of Collettsville, North Carolina. It is situated wholly within Pisgah National Forest. It reaches  and is nearby Brown Mountain Ridge, which is known for its mysterious Brown Mountain Lights. Adams Mountain rises along the eastern rim of Wilson Creek Gorge. Its slopes generate feeder streams for Wilson Creek as it flows towards the Catawba River.

See also
List of mountains in North Carolina

References

Mountains of North Carolina
Protected areas of Caldwell County, North Carolina
Pisgah National Forest
Mountains of Caldwell County, North Carolina